Alvin Kahle (November 7, 1909 – October 27, 1986) was a Republican member of the Pennsylvania House of Representatives.

References

1909 births
1986 deaths
People from Clarion County, Pennsylvania
Republican Party members of the Pennsylvania House of Representatives
20th-century American politicians